The History of the American legal profession covers the work, training, and professional activities of lawyers from the colonial era to the present.  Lawyers grew increasingly powerful in the colonial era as experts in the English common law, which was adopted by the colonies.  By the 21st century, over one million practitioners in the United States held law degrees, and many others served the legal system as justices of the peace,  paralegals, marshalls, and other aides.

Colonial Era
Legal procedures in the 17th century were quite informal, with judges discussing issues directly with the people involved in the case. Citizens generally represented themselves, which resulted in benefits to some and disadvantages to others. The solution was to hire a professional lawyer. By 1700, both judges and judicial procedures had become much more formal; to win a case, a client needed a lawyer to handle the arguments, cite the precedents, and neutralize the opposing counsel.  While England still kept an elaborate hierarchy of judges, barristers, and solicitors with formal qualifications, colonial lawyers were '"jacks of all trades" who learned their skills by apprenticeship and by closely watching court procedures. Colonial legislatures passed laws to fix the fees lawyers could charge for standardized procedures and maintain these fees relatively low. This often led some lawyers to handle a high volume of cases more speedily. Provincial courts usually made a circuit between the different counties, spending a few days in each county seat. Each attorney might handle 30 to 40 cases in three or four days. The great majority of cases dealt with debts, which were quickly handled. Occasionally, there were land disputes, which were much more complicated and time-consuming because they required searches in legal titles, which were poorly indexed. Bystanders attended for the sport of watching the often dramatic cases.  Lawyers thereby collected a steady stream of monthly income. This set them apart from the merchants, planters, and farmers who depended on seasonal sales or long-term trading voyages. By becoming familiar with the intimate economic details of the counties, lawyers could take advantage of bargains. The close-knit nature of the profession also allowed them to build up their wealth, connections, and political base. They were highly flexible and had the time and opportunity to hold local offices in the public service, most of which paid poorly, but some of which were quite generous. Decade by decade, lawyers emerged as high income groups, with a wide range of contacts.

In New York City during colonial times, legal practitioners were full-time businessmen little legal training. Instead of formal education, they would watch court proceedings and piece them together with snippets of English law. Court proceedings were informal, as many judges had no more training than the attorneys.  By the 1760s, the situation had dramatically changed. Lawyers were essential to the rapidly growing international trade, dealing with questions of partnerships, contracts, and insurance. The sums of money involved were large, and hiring a competent lawyer was a very expensive proposition. Lawyers were now professionally trained, and conversant in an extremely complex language that combined highly specific legal terms and motions with a dose of Law Latin. Court proceedings became a baffling to ordinary laypeople. Lawyers became more specialized and built their fee schedule on the basis of their reputation for success. As their status, wealth, and power rose, animosity followed.

Professional lawyers were widely disliked in the colonies.  Families would often share stories of being deceived or cheated by devious attorneys.  As legal author and scholar  Roscoe Pound once said, "Lawyers as a class were very unpopular in the colonies."Lawyers of this period tried to raise their professional standards by forming local bar associations, but had little success in the colonial era. Full professionalization would not become standardized until after the Civil War.

Lawyers and politics
Many British governors were upper class aristocrats appointed into their positions not trained in the law and felt unduly constrained by the legalistic demands of colonial lawyers. From the 1680s to 1715, numerous efforts were made to strengthen Royal control and diminish legal constraints over the power of the governors. Colonial lawyers attempted to strike back by utilization of an important technique that developed in Boston, Philadelphia, and New York City in the 1720s and 1730s. Lawyers were able to mobilize public opinion by using the new availability of weekly newspapers and print shops that produced inexpensive pamphlets to disseminate ideas about legal rights in the U.S. as Englishmen. By the 1750s and 1760s, however, there was a counter-attack ridiculing and demeaning the lawyers as pettifoggers. Their image and influence declined as a consequence. The lawyers of colonial New York organized a bar association that 1768 during the bitter political dispute between factions from the De Lancey and Livingston families.  Over the next century, there were various unsuccessful attempts in New York to build an effective organization of lawyers. Finally, a Bar Association emerged in 1869 that proved successful and continues to operate to this day as the New York City Bar Association.

The American Revolution saw the departure of many leading lawyers, and the arrival in high offices of younger lawyers. In most of the 13 colonies, a prominent faction of the legal profession were the Loyalists, as their clients were often tied to royal authority or British merchants and financiers. After the revolution, these practitioners were not allowed to practice law unless they took a loyalty oath to the new United States of America. Many went to Britain or Canada after the war. The lawyers who remained had a major impact on shaping the new nation. Lawyers comprised 45 percent of the fifty-six signers of the Declaration of Independence, 69 percent of the forty-five members of the Constitutional Convention, and 40 percent of the twenty-five Senators in the 1st United States Congress that opened in 1789, as well as 26 percent of the sixty-five Representatives.

Becoming a lawyer
In the 18th and 19th centuries, most young people became lawyers by apprenticing in the office of an established lawyer, where they would engage in clerical duties such as drawing up routine contracts and wills, while studying standard treatises; this became known as reading law. The apprentice would then have to be admitted to the local court in order to practice law. 

This apprenticeship system favored nepotism, as friends and relatives of lawyers placed family members in these positions. An alternative more broadly open to the middle class was to attend academic law schools. The College of William and Mary set up the first chair in law in 1779, 21 years after the first such chair was established in England. The first independent law school was the Litchfield Law School, founded in 1782 in Connecticut by Tapping Reeve. Between 1784 and its closure in 1833, it trained over 1000  lawyers, many of whom became leaders of the bar at the state level, or politicians at the state and national level.  Alumni included two vice presidents (Aaron Burr and John C Calhoun), as well as 101 members of the United States House of Representatives, 28 United States senators, six cabinet secretaries, three justices of the United States Supreme Court, 14 state governors and 13 state supreme court chief justices. By the 1860s, academic law schools tied to universities were increasingly popular, as typified by the University of Pennsylvania, which opened its law department in 1850. By the middle of the 19th century, there were over a hundred law schools in the country, most of them very small institutions run as a sideline operation.

The most famous law training program was the Harvard Law School, founded in 1817 as part of Harvard University. Supreme Court Justice Joseph Story was, for decades, a highly influential senior professor. Story's many compilations and law books established a national curriculum for local law schools. Even more influential was Christopher Columbus Langdell, Harvard Law School's dean from 1870 to 1895. Instead of the usual practice of daily lectures, Langdale introduced the case system. Professors called on students to explain the legal reasoning behind specific cases, teaching them to reason like judges. This case method spread rapidly to all law schools. By the 20th century, many local bar associations required graduation from an accredited law school before a candidate could take the bar examamination and begin to practice law. 

Local bar associations before 1870 were akin to social groups, which took little or no responsibility for maintaining the quality of admissions or performance by the membership. In 1870, leading lawyers in Manhattan organized the "Association of the Bar of the City of New York" to battle the notorious political corruption of the Tweed machine. The bar quickly emerged as a powerful organization and a model to others; in the 1870s, eight cities and eight statewide associations were in operation. By 1890, there were 20 state bar associations, 40 by 1900, and 48 by 1916. By 1890, the number had increased to 159 bar at the local level, and over 1,100 by 1930. They still performed social functions, but were increasingly called upon to organize while combatting long-standing hostility against the legal profession. An important priority for the states and for the national American Bar Association was to maintain control over state bar examinations and over requirements for law schools, such as academic curriculum, library facilities, and availability of full-time faculty.

California Gold Rush and Westward expansion
The sudden acquisition of the Mexican Cession in 1848 followed by a massive Gold Rush into the state caused a hurried transition to California statehood in 1850. Legal conditions were chaotic at first, as the new state lacked lawyers, judicial precedents, and prisons as well as a largely dysfunctional legal system and little to no civil government.  Lawyers arrived from many different states and jurisdictions, often with little legal experience.  Citizens formed vigilante tribunals, most notable of which was the San Francisco Committee of Vigilance, founded in 1851 and lasted well into the 1850s. Due to the lack of an established legal system in many communities, vigilantes took justice into their own hands, often in the form of drum-head trials, whipping, banishment, or hanging. As Law of the land developed, courts began to set precedents on such issues as women's rights, contractual rights, real estate and mortgages, tort law, and review of flawed statutes. An elaborate new body of law was quickly developed to deal with gold mining claims and water rights. By the 1860s, San Francisco had developed a professional police force to dispense with the use of vigilante actions. By 1865, the increasingly established legal system allowed for courts, legislators, lawyers, and other legal professionals to work in an effective manner.

White shoe firms and Emergence of Big Law

In American phrase "white shoe" derives from white bucks (or derby shoes) worn by many Ivy League college students.  The term came to represent the long-established, high-prestige legal services provided by White Anglo Saxon Protestants mainly. They serviced large institutions, such as megacorporations. Such firms hired many males that were often outfitted with the white bucks, inspiring the moniker. Such individuals had a tendency to possess degrees from top law schools, such as Harvard Law Scool, Yale Law School, and Columbia Law School, as well as useful family and network connections in many cases. White shoe firms emerged in the late 19th century and were usually based in the Northeastern U.S. These firms would become large go and evolve into what is known as BigLaw.

Large firms were especially in demand by major railroads, which were built through complicated consolidations and faced complex legal situations in multiple states. Previously, law firms were small operations with two or three partners and a handful of clerks. As corporations grew larger and developed more rigid structures, they spread over too many legal jurisdictions for local, small firms to service.

Key operational characteristics of big firms remained the same as those developed by Paul Cravath, who made a reputation from handling complex lawsuits for the new electrical industry. Devising the Cravath System, he enlarged the law office, and professionalized it by establishing full-time librarians, a recruiting system focused on leading law schools, lockstep compensation, and  law firm partners who specialized in specific practice areas, a model largely followed by white-shoe firms throughout the 20th century.

Diversity

Women
In 1900, there were 108,000 lawyers and judges in the U.S., of which the majority were males. Opportunities for women remained limited, however, women were still involved in the legal business. A notable example, Isabel Darlington, was admitted to Pennsylvania's Chester County Bar Association in 1897. She was the only female attorney in highly populated Chester County until the shortages of men in World War II allowed for more opportunities to women.

In 1955, there were 5,000 female lawyers, 1.3 percent of the country's total. Law schools generally rejected female students- only four percent of the students in 1965 were women. By 1973, the figure was 16 percent; by 1979 it was 32 percent, and reaching near equal numbers as males of law students in the 21st century. This transition began under Jimmy Carter's leadership in the late 1970s. Sandra Day O'Connor (born 1930) graduated third in her class at Stanford Law School in 1952, where she served on the Stanford Law Review. Yet, her applications to San Francisco law firms were all rejected. Likewise, when she moved to Phoenix, Arizona in 1957, no law firm would hire her. As a result, she set up an independent practice. She became active in Republican Party politics and was the first woman in the country to become a majority leader in the state senate. She was appointed as a county judge in Maricopa County  in 1974 and later was elevated to the Arizona Court of Appeals. President Ronald Reagan astonished the nation in 1981 when he appointed her as the first woman on the United States Supreme Court. In 2019, the American Bar Association reported that, while women consistently comprised half of the student body of American law schools, only 23% of law firm partners are women and women part minorities represented by just "3% of all partners and 2% of equity partners".

African American lawyers
Opportunities for Black lawyers were scarce outside the Black community.   William Thaddeus Coleman Jr., after graduating first in his class at Harvard Law School in 1946, became the first Black law clerk at the U.S. Supreme Court.  In 1949, he became the first Black lawyer hired at New York's Paul, Weiss, Rifkind, Wharton & Garrison. He was the second Black person be appointed to the cabinet, serving as former President Gerald Ford's U.S. Secretary of Transportation, from 1975 to 1977.

The legacy of racial segregation remains in the legal business - with, for instance, Davis Polk being named after John W. Davis, a defender of racial segregation.

Hispanic and Latino lawyers
In the first half of the 19th century, Mexico established a judicial system for its northernmost districts, in the present-day Southwestern United States. There were no professionally trained lawyers or judges. Instead, there were numerous legal roles such as notario, escribano, asesor, auditor de Guerra, justicia mayor, procurador, and juez receptor. With the annexation by the United States in 1848, Congress established an entirely new territorial legal system, implementing U.S. laws, forms, and procedures. A vast majority of lawyers and judges were new arrivals from the United States, as there was no place in the new system for the original Mexican roles.  Elfego Baca (1865 – 1945) was an outlaw-turned-lawman, lawyer, and politician in New Mexico in the late 19th and early 20th centuries.  In 1888, after serving as a County Sheriff, Baca became a U.S. Marshal. He served for two years and then began studying law. In December 1894, he was admitted to the bar and practiced law in New Mexico until 1904, then held numerous local political offices; when New Mexico became a state, in 1912, he was the unsuccessful Republican candidate for Congress. In the late 1950s, Disney turned Baca into the first Hispanic popular culture hero in the United States, through depictions in various television shows, six comic books, a feature film, and related merchandising. Nevertheless, Disney deliberately avoided ethnic tension by presenting Baca as a generalized Western hero, portraying a standard hero similar to "Davy Crockett, but in Mexican dress".

There has been a significant increase in Hispanic females entering the legal profession since the start of the 21st century.  They have made steady progress in political incorporation via the judiciary, especially in county courts.

Jewish lawyers
Jewish lawyers were often discriminated against and were not hired by many major law firms of the time. These lawyers began to establish their own firms, which became increasingly successful as the 20th century progressed. Major law firms established by Jews attained elite status in dealing with top-ranked corporations. As late as 1950, there was not a single large law firm started by Jews in New York City. By 1965, however, six of the 20 largest firms were founded by Jews, and by 1980, four of the ten largest were founded by Jewish lawyers.

Diversity in the judiciary
Franklin D. Roosevelt appointed the first Black federal judge, William H. Hastie in 1937. Reynaldo G. Garza, a protégé of Lyndon B. Johnson, was appointed as the first Hispanic federal judge in 1961.  Lyndon Johnson appointed Thurgood Marshall as the first Black Justice on the Supreme Court in 1967.  He was best known for his 1954 arguments as First-Director counsel in the overturning of segregation in schools in Brown v. Board of Education. When Marshall retired, George Bush appointed Black lawyer and former Chairman of the U.S. Equal Employment Opportunity Commission (1982-1990) and judge in the United States Court of Appeals for the District of Columbia Circuit (1990-1991), Clarence Thomas, to the Supreme Court, who was confirmed in October of 1991 by the U.S. Senate.  In 2009, President Barack Obama appointed Sonia Sotomayor, a woman of Puerto Rican origin, to the Supreme Court. She has the distinction of being the first Supreme Court Justice of Hispanic origin.

21st century
The COVID-19 pandemic had a major influence on many practices within the legal profession. In 2021,  Thomson Reuters published a joint study of Georgetown University Law Center on Ethics and the Legal Profession and the Thomson Reuters Institute, "2021 Report on the State of the Legal Market", which states:

See also
 History of the legal profession

 The American Lawyer, monthly magazine published since 1979
 The Green Bag, popular magazine for lawyers
 Jurist
 Law professor
Law school in the United States
 Lawyer
Legal education in the United States
 Legal profession
 List of law schools in the United States
 List of jurists
 Paralegal

Notes

Further reading

 Bloomfield, Maxwell. American Lawyers in a Changing Society: 1776 – 1876 (1976).
 Chroust, Anton-Hermann. The Rise of the Legal Profession in America (2 vol 1965), covers the colonial and early national period down to the 1820s.
 Chroust.  "Legal Profession in Colonial America." Notre Dame Law 33 (1957): 51+.  online
 Chroust, "American Legal Profession: Its Agony and Ecstasy (1776-1840)." Notre Dame Law. 46 (1970): 487+ online.
 Friedman, Lawrence M. American Law in the twentieth century (Yale UP,  2004) especially chapters 2 and 15 on the legal profession.
 Gawalt, Gerard W. ed. The New High Priests: Lawyers in Post–Civil War America (1984). online
 Gawalt, Gerard W. The Promise of Power: The Emergence of the Legal Profession in Massachusetts, 1760-1840 (1979).
 Gawalt, Gerard W. "Sources of Anti-Lawyer Sentiment in Massachusetts," American Journal of Legal History 14 (October 1970) :283-307.
 Hoffer, Peter Charles.  Uncivil Warriors: The Lawyers' Civil War (2018) online review
 Kaczorowski, Robert J. "Fordham University School of Law: A Case Study of Legal Education in Twentieth-Century America." Fordham Law Review  87 (2018): 861+. online
 Kennedy, Duncan. Legal Education and the Reproduction of Hierarchy: A Polemic Against the System - A Critical Edition, New York University Press, 2007
 McMorrow, Judith A. "Law and Lawyers in the US: The Hero-Villain Dichotomy." Boston College Law School Legal Studies Research Paper 213 (2010).   online
 Nash, Gary. "The Philadelphia Bench and Bar, 1800–1860," Comparative Studies in Society and History 7 (1965):203-20.
 Newman, Roger K. The Yale Biographical Dictionary of American Law (2009)
 Oldman,  Mark,ed. The Vault.com Guide to America's Top 50 Law Firms (1998)
 Oller, John. White Shoe: How a New Breed of Wall Street Lawyers Changed Big Business and the American Century (2019),  excerpt
 Power, Roscoe. "Legal Profession in America," 19 Notre Dame Law Review  (1944) pp 334+  online<
 Wald, Eli, "The rise and fall of the WASP and Jewish law firms." Stanford Law Review 60 (2007) pp. 1803–1866  online

 Alozie, Nicholas O. "Black Representation on State Judiciaries." Social Science Quarterly 69.4 (1988): 979+.
 Burke, W. Lewis. All for Civil Rights: African American Lawyers in South Carolina, 1868–1968 (2017)  online
 Drachman, Virginia. Sisters in Law: Women Lawyers in Modern American History. (Harvard UP, 1998). 
 Finkleman, Paul, ed. African Americans and the Legal Profession in Historical Perspectives:  1700-1990 (1992).
 McDaniel, Cecily Barker. “Fearing I Shall Not Do My Duty to My Race If I Remain Silent”: Law and Its Call to African American Women, 1872–1932. (PhD Diss. The Ohio State U, 2007)  online.
 M. F. III. "The Negro Lawyer in Virginia: A Survey" Virginia Law Review 51#3 (Apr., 1965), pp. 521–545 online
 Mollison, Irvin C. "Negro Lawyers in Mississippi." Journal of Negro History 15.1 (1930): 38–71. online
 Morello, Karen Berger. The Invisible Bar: The Woman Lawyer in America, 1638 to the Present (1986).
 Segal, Geraldine R. Blacks in the Law: Philadelphia and the Nation (U of Pennsylvania Press, 1983).
 Smith Jr, J. Clay. Emancipation: The Making of the Black Lawyer, 1844-1944 (U of Pennsylvania Press, 1999). 
 Weisberg, D. Kelly, ed. Women and the Law: A Social Historical Perspective: vol 2 Property, family, and the legal profession (1982).
 Weisberg,  D. Kelly. “Barred from the Bar: Women and Legal Education in the United States, 1870-1890.” Journal of Legal Education 28 (1977): 485–507.
 Wortman,  Marlene Stein, ed. Women in American Law: From Colonial Times to the New Deal (1985), text of 163 primary source documents

External links
  "Other Powerful Forces: A Brief Demographic History Of The Legal Profession"

Legal professions
Legal history